Volodymyr Dzhus (born 23 June 1993) is a Ukrainian professional racing cyclist, who currently rides for UCI Continental team . He rode at the 2014, 2015, 2020 and 2021 UCI Track Cycling World Championships.

Major results

Road

2012
 7th Overall Tour d'Azerbaïdjan
2015
 4th Horizon Park Classic
 8th Grand Prix of ISD
2016
 6th Time trial, National Road Championships
2018
 2nd Horizon Park Classic
 6th Time trial, National Road Championships
2019
 2nd Odessa Grand Prix

Track

2014
 2nd Individual pursuit, National Championships
2017
 National Championships
1st  Individual pursuit
1st  Team pursuit
2018
 National Championships
2nd Madison
2nd Team pursuit
2019
 National Championships
1st  Individual pursuit
2nd Team pursuit

References

External links

1993 births
Living people
Ukrainian male cyclists
Sportspeople from Donetsk
Cyclists at the 2019 European Games
European Games competitors for Ukraine
21st-century Ukrainian people